Åke Sandgren (born 13 May 1955) is a Swedish-Danish film director and screenwriter. He has written and directed a number of films in a variety of genres, mostly in Denmark where he now lives.

Biography
Sandgren studied Film Science and Philosophy at Stockholm University from 1976 to 1979 and then moved to Denmark where he studied film direction at the National Film School of Denmark from 1979 to 1982. After graduation, he worked as a writer and director of films in both Sweden and Denmark.

He won the Golden Bear award for Best Short Film at the 1984 Berlin International Film Festival with his film Cykelsymfonien (The Bicycle Symphony). His 1989 film Miraklet i Valby (Miracle at Valby) won the Grand Prize at the 2nd Yubari International Fantastic Film Festival held in February 1991. It also won the awards for Best Film, Best Director and Best Screenplay at the 25th Guldbagge Awards. He was nominated again for the Guldbagge Award for Best Director in 1993 for the film The Slingshot.

He has collaborated with a number of other Danish film directors including Søren Kragh-Jacobsen, Stig Håkan Larsson, and Lars von Trier.

Filmography

Notes

External links

1955 births
Living people
People from Umeå
Swedish film producers
Swedish screenwriters
Swedish male screenwriters
Swedish film directors
Best Director Guldbagge Award winners
Best Screenplay Guldbagge Award winners